The North American Menopause Society (NAMS), founded in 1989, is a nonprofit, multidisciplinary organization with the mission of promoting the health and quality of life of women during midlife and beyond through an understanding of menopause and healthy aging. Based in Cleveland, Ohio, NAMS has more than 2,800 members from 51 countries, with 88% of its members from North America.Its membership includes experts from many disciplines such as medicine, nursing, sociology, psychology, nutrition, anthropology, epidemiology, pharmacy, and education.

History
The North American Menopause Society was founded in 1989 by Dr. Wulf Utian, the Arthur H. Bill Professor Emeritus of Reproductive Biology at Case Western Reserve University School of Medicine and one of the three original Founders of the International Menopause Society. Dr. Utian served as the Executive Director of NAMS from its inception until 2009. Dr. Stephanie Faubion currently serves as the Society's Medical Director and Ms. Carolyn Develen as the Society's Chief Operating Officer.

Resources and publications
In 1994 NAMS launched Menopause, a peer-reviewed scientific journal meant to provide a forum for clinical research, applied basic science, and practice guidelines on all aspects of menopause. The scope of Menopause encompasses many varied biomedical areas, including internal medicine, family practice, obstetrics, gynecology, medical subspecialties such as cardiology and geriatrics, epidemiology, pathology, sociology, psychology, anthropology, and pharmacology. Additional professional educational material provided by NAMS includes the textbook Menopause Practice: A Clinician's Guide; position statements on hormone therapy, management of menopausal symptoms, prevention and treatment of osteoporosis, and other topics; an annual scientific conference; and the e-mail newsletters First to Know, Menopause Care Updates, and Menopause e-Consult.

NAMS also releases consumer educational materials such as the print resource The Menopause Guidebook and the e-mail newsletter Menopause Flashes. Other educational resources related to menopause can be found at the NAMS website menopause.org.

NAMS Certified Menopause Practitioner program
The North American Menopause Society has developed an opportunity for licensed healthcare providers to demonstrate their expertise by passing a competency exam and becoming credentialed as a NAMS Certified Menopause Practitioner or NCMP. NAMS provides a listing of NCMP-credentialed clinicians on its public website.

See also
EMAS, The European Menopause and Andropause Society
The Endocrine Society
International Osteoporosis Foundation
American College of Obstetricians and Gynecologists
American College of Physicians
Women's health
Menopause
Hot flash

References

External links
General
NAMS Official Website
NAMS Certified Menopause Practitioner Directory

Video
 NAMS YouTube Channel

Medical and health organizations based in Ohio
Obstetrics and gynaecology organizations
Organizations established in 1989
1989 establishments in Ohio
Organizations based in Cleveland